Ataullah abu Ammar Jununi is the leader of the Arakan Rohingya Salvation Army (ARSA), a Rohingya insurgent group active in northern Rakhine State. Ataullah appears in several videos released online by ARSA, where he gives press statements and speeches.

Early life
Ataullah was born in Karachi, Pakistan to a migrant family, who had fled the religious persecution in his native Rakhine State in Myanmar (also known as Arakan, Burma) sometime in the 1960s. At an early age, Ataullah's family moved to Mecca, Saudi Arabia, where he was enrolled in an Islamic school. In his later years in Mecca, Ataullah served as an imam to the Rohingya diaspora community of around 150,000.

Insurgency
The International Crisis Group (ICG) said in a report that it interviewed members of his group. The think-tank said that the leader of the group has close links with Saudi Arabia. The ICG report released in December 2016 states that he left Saudi Arabia in 2012, shortly after religiously motivated violence erupted in Rakhine State. A Myanmar government press release claims Ataullah spent six months training in modern guerrilla warfare under the Taliban in Pakistan. The ICG report stated that though not confirmed, there are indications he went to Pakistan, and possibly elsewhere, and that he received practical training in modern guerrilla warfare. Several members of the group also stated to ICG that he may have received additional training in Libya before his return to Rakhine State, but this remains unconfirmed.

On 9 October 2016, Ataullah led hundreds of ARSA insurgents to the Bangladesh–Myanmar border, where they attacked Burmese border police posts. A week later, Ataullah appeared in a video online, claiming responsibility for the attacks.

Ataullah led a second large-scale attack on 25 August 2017, which resulted in the deaths of 71 people. ARSA was blamed for the Kha Maung Seik massacre (the killings of 99 Bengali Hindus) that occurred on the same day, a charge Ataullah denies.

Ataullah's half-brother Muhammad Shah Ali, a member of ARSA, was arrested by the Armed Police Battalion on 16 January 2022 in a camp near Cox's Bazar while carrying arms and drugs.

Ataullah was accused by Bangladesh Police in an investigative report submitted in June 2022 of ordering the murder of Mohib Ullah because he feared his and his organization Arakan Rohingya Society for Peace and Human Rights's popularity, which he believed could be an impediment in ARSA's operations. The police also stated that he had told Mohib Ullah to shut down the operations of his organization and join ARSA, but he refused.

References

Living people
Year of birth missing (living people)
Rohingya people
Pakistani people of Rohingya descent
People from Karachi